Villiers and Heytesbury was an electoral district of the Legislative Assembly in the Australian state of Victoria from 1856 to 1904. It was based in western Victoria, and included the area from Lake Corangamite along the coast westward past Port Fairy.

The district of Villiers and Heytesbury was one of the initial districts of the first Victorian Legislative Assembly, 1856.

Members for Villiers and Heytesbury in the Legislative Assembly
Two members initially, one after the electoral redistribution of 1889.

External links

References

Former electoral districts of Victoria (Australia)
1856 establishments in Australia
1904 disestablishments in Australia